trans-Propenylbenzene is an organic compound with the formula C6H5CH=CHCH3.  It is one of two isomers of 1-propenylbenzene.  Both isomers are colorless flammable liquids.  It is formed by the isomerization of allylbenzene.

References

Alkene derivatives
Aromatic hydrocarbons
Hydrocarbons
C3-Benzenes